E 512 is a European B class road in France, connecting the cities Remiremont, Thann, and Mulhouse.

Route and E-road junctions 
 
 Remiremont
 Thann
 Mulhouse:  E25, E54, E60

External links 
 UN Economic Commission for Europe: Overall Map of E-road Network (2007)
 International E-road network

International E-road network
Roads in France